Richard Allen Markowitz (September 3, 1926 in Santa Monica, California – December 6, 1994 in Santa Monica, California) was an American film and television composer. He was the father of singer Kate Markowitz.

Biography
As a Santa Monica High School student, Markowitz led a big band called Dick Allen and the Teenagers under the name Dick Allen. Following his graduation 
in 1943 he performed military service in World War II.  After the war, Markowitz studied music in Paris and under Arthur Honegger and Arnold Schoenberg.  While in Paris he played in jazz clubs and met his wife Haru Yanai.

Markowitz began film composing with the 1958 film Stakeout on Dope Street for director Irvin Kershner.  He collaborated again with Kernsher on the films The Young Captives, (1959), Hoodlum Priest (1961), and Face in the Rain (1963). He collaborated with his wife on the score of the film Roadracers (1959) where Haru wrote lyrics to the songs. His other film scores included One Man's Way (1963), Bus Riley's Back in Town (1965), Wild Seed (1965), Ride Beyond Vengeance (1966), The Shooting (1966), which starred Warren Oates and Jack Nicholson, Cry for Me, Billy (1972), and Circle of Power (1981).

In 1961 he composed the score for Bert I. Gordon's The Magic Sword and began his television career composing the theme song and background music to The Rebel where the theme song was sung by Johnny Cash.

He again scored a well known Western TV series when he replaced Dimitri Tiomkin in conducting the theme and background music to The Wild Wild West.  Keeping with the Western genre he scored the television movie (Scalplock) that spawned the series The Iron Horse as well as providing music for a variety of American television series and made for TV movies such as Weekend of Terror (1970), The Hanged Man (1974), Brinks: The Great Robbery (1976), Mayday at 40,000 Feet! (1976) and Death Car on the Freeway (1979).

Television series scored by Markowitz
 The Invaders
Bus Riley's Back in Town
The FBI
The Wild Wild West
Mission: Impossible
Mannix
Quincy, M.E.
Police Story
Buck Rogers in the 25th Century
Columbo
Dynasty ( 2 episodes 1986 )

Television
"Episode(s)" denotes the listing may be incomplete.

References

External links 
 
 In Memoriam Richard Markowitz (1926–1994)

American film score composers
1926 births
1994 deaths
Musicians from Santa Monica, California
20th-century classical musicians
20th-century American composers
American male film score composers
20th-century American male musicians
American military personnel of World War II